Justice Henry may refer to:

 J. L. Henry, associate justice of the Texas Supreme Court
 James Henry (Continental Congress), associate justice of the Supreme Court of Appeals of Virginia
 Joe W. Henry, associate justice of the Tennessee Supreme Court
 John Ward Henry, associate justice of the Supreme Court of Missouri
 William Alexander Henry, puisne justice of the Supreme Court of Canada
 Winder Laird Henry, chief judge of the First Judicial Circuit of Maryland